The Lyceum Theater of Clovis, New Mexico, located at 409 Main St., was built during 1919–20.  It was listed on the National Register of Historic Places in 2007.

It is a two-story concrete building with a vaulted roof which is hidden from street view by a stepped parapet.  It has a 120-seat balcony.  It was designed by the Boller Brothers architectural firm with elements of Mission Revival style.  Its facade was altered in the 1940s to add "a modicum of modernistic details" and to add "neon on a wall-mounted sign above the marquee".

It is categorized in the NRHP nomination as having Moderne style.

References

National Register of Historic Places in Curry County, New Mexico
Moderne architecture in the United States
Buildings and structures completed in 1920
Clovis, New Mexico
Theatres on the National Register of Historic Places in New Mexico